The 1901 Sewanee Tigers football team was an American football team that represented the Sewanee Tigers of Sewanee: The University of the South as an independent during the 1901 college football season. In its third season under head coach Billy Suter, the team compiled a 4–2–2 record.

Sewanee was a member of the Southern Intercollegiate Athletic Association during the majority of the 1901 season. However, the association indefinitely suspended Sewanee on November 26, 1901, for allowing an ineligible player to participate in the November 16 game against Vanderbilt.

Schedule

References

Sewanee
Sewanee Tigers football seasons
Sewanee Tigers football